Andreaea depressinervis is a species of moss in the family Andreaeaceae that was discovered by Jules Cardot in 1901. It is found on both the South Shetland Islands and the Antarctica.

Andreaea depressinervis has costate leaves, which means they have parallel veins throughout the leaves.

References

Andreaeaceae
Flora of Antarctica